The Bay Horse is a pub on Blossom Street, immediately west of the city centre of York, in England.

The core of the building was constructed in the late-17th century, after the Siege of York, as a small farmhouse.  It was first recorded as an inn in 1748, around which time it was raised to three storeys, and extended from an L-plan to a square plan.  It is now a three bay building, built of brick, with a rendered front which has a parapet disguising the tiled roof.  The staircase dates from the mid-18th century, and there are some fittings from the Regency period.

By 1798, the inn was named the "Bay Horse".  This name is believed to refer to the horse Bay Malton, who won a major race nearby, at York Racecourse.  Some of the windows were altered in the 19th-century.  From 1862 until 1874, the pub and its brewhouse were owned by the Institute of the Blessed Virgin Mary.  By 1969, the pub was owned by John Smith's Brewery, which restored the ground floor, reusing some of the Victorian fittings.

References

Blossom Street
Grade II listed pubs in York